List of bids for the Olympic Games include:

 Bids for the Youth Olympic Games
 List of bids for the Summer Olympics
 List of bids for the Winter Olympics